is a Japanese singer, actress and former member of the idol girl group AKB48 where she was active in Team A. She also participated in the Korean-Japanese show Produce 48.

Biography
In 2007, Miyazaki passed an audition for AKB48 and became a kenkyūsei (trainee) for the group's 5th generation.  On July 13, 2008, she was promoted to Team A along with four other girls. On October 22, 2008, when AKB48 released the 10th single "Ōgoe Diamond", Miyazaki was listed among the performers on the A-side track for the first time.

In February 2009, Miyazaki changed her talent agency to Horipro.  In the AKB48 general election for that year, she ranked 18th and was put on the A-side team for the group's 13th single. She still have the record of being shortly senbatsu (1 year after she debuted in AKB...) On July 10, 2009, for an event dedicated to the Nattō Day, Miyazaki with Tomomi Itano and Tomomi Kasai formed a subunit called Nattō Angel. At the event, they sang the self-titled track.

On January 22, 2010, in the TV series Majisuka Gakuen, Miyazaki debuted as an actress. On May 21, Miho Miyazaki was transferred from Team A to Team B. The transfer was announced on August 23 of the previous year. In the AKB48's 17th single selection Miyazaki placed 21st with 6,231 votes. This result was enough to pass the selection for the title track, but left her out of the media senbatsu*, that she was part of for the previous, 16th, single "Ponytail to Shushu". In July, she again participated in the Nattō Day celebration. That time, her group was called Nattō Angel Z, and the other girls in the unit were Sumire Satō and Haruka Ishida, both from Team B. On November 20, Miyazaki performed in AKB48's concert at the J-pop Culture Festival in Moscow, Russia.

On May 14, 2011, Miyazaki joined AKB48 members Misaki Iwasa and Mika Komori to launch the first AKB48 concept store in Singapore. The event gathered hundreds of fans. In the general election, Miyazaki placed 27th.

In the 2012 general election, held on June 6 at Nippon Budokan, Miho Miyazaki placed 38th. Miyazaki was transferred from Team B to Team K as part of the teams' reshuffle announced during the Tokyo Dome concert on August 24, 2012.

On April 6, 2016, Miyazaki acted on the radio "ON8+1" as a radio host for the first time and has worked on this radio show every Wednesday.

In 2018, she participated in the South Korean television competition Produce 48 where she was eliminated in the final episode in 15th place.

On December 12, 2021, Miyazaki announced her graduation from AKB48. She officially graduated from the group on April 15, 2022.

She plans to start a career in South Korea after graduation.

Personal life
Miyazaki played for a footsal team called Xanadu loves NHC.

Singles with AKB48

AKB48 stage units
 AKB48 Himawarigumi 2nd Stage  "Yume o Shinaseru Wake ni Ikanai"
 "Bye Bye Bye"
 Hitomi Komatani's and Minami Takahashi's stand-by
 Team A 4th Stage "Tadaima Ren'aichū"
 
 Minami Takahashi's stand-by
 AKB48 Team A 5th Stage "Ren'ai Kinshi Jōrei" 
 Minami Takahashi, Minami Minegishi, Miho Miyazaki
 THEATER G-ROSSO "Yume wo Shinaseru Wake ni Ikanai"
 
 Erena Ono, Miho Miyazaki, Aika Ōta
 AKB48 Team B 5th Stage "Theater no Megami"

Filmography

TV series
  (January 22 - February 5, March 26, 2010, TV Tokyo), as Myao
  (July 31, 2010 - August 27, 2010, WOWOW)
  (May 6 - July 1, 2011, TV Tokyo), Myao
  Ep.30 - Class Reunion (January 21, 2016, TV Asahi), Minori Shinozaki
  Ep. 18 - Marriage Meeting (June 15, 2016, TV Asahi), Miki

References

External links

 Miho Miyazaki profile at AKB48 
 Miho Miyazaki agency profile at Horipro 

1993 births
Living people
Singers from Tokyo
Japanese idols
Japanese women pop singers
AKB48 members
Horipro artists
Produce 48 contestants
21st-century Japanese women singers
21st-century Japanese singers